Topçu may refer to:

 Canan Topçu (born 1965), Turkish-German female writer 
 Ebru Topçu (born 1996), Turkish female footballer
 Mutlu Topçu (born 1970), former Turkish footballer
 Yalçın Topçu (born 1957), Turkish politician
 Yaşar Topçu (born 1941), Turkish politician and former government minister

Turkish-language surnames